Zoom Corporation is a Japan-based audio company whose main business is the design and development of electronic devices for music. The company’s products are sold worldwide. Its brand slogan "We're for creators" reflects the company’s commitment to creators such as musicians, video creators, and podcasters. Established in 1983, the company is listed on the JASDAQ market of the Tokyo Stock Exchange.

Corporate History

Zoom Corporation was founded in Tokyo in 1983 and in 2004, established ZOOM HK LTD as a logistics base in Hong Kong. In 2009, it set up ZOOM Dongguan Corporation (China) as a quality control operation; 2013, formed ZOOM North America, LLC (US) as a distribution base; 2017, listed on Tokyo Stock Exchange JASDAQ (Standard); In 2018, acquired shares of Mogar Music S.p.A. (Italy) (current consolidated subsidiary Mogar Music S.r.l.), making it a subsidiary as a distribution center; and in 2020, acquired all shares of ZOOM North America, LLC (US), making it a wholly-owned subsidiary; 2020, ZOOM UK Distribution LTD excluded as equity method affiliate; 2021, acquired all shares of Hook Up, Inc. in Japan, making it a wholly-owned subsidiary.

Business Model

Zoom is a global company selling electronic devices for music developed for a wide range of professional and amateur customers in some 130 countries. The Japanese headquarters primarily focuses on product development and marketing, while overseas sales activities are conducted via group companies and sales agencies. By adopting a fabless method that outsources production to third parties, technical management resources are concentrated at product development headquarters, thereby enabling the company to respond to the needs of a wide range of creators such as musicians, video creators, and podcasters. As a global brand, approximately 90% of sales are accounted for by markets outside Japan.

Major Product Categories

In the fiscal year ended December 31, 2020, Zoom Corporation's main product categories accounted for the following percentages of sales: Handy Audio Recorders (HAR), 43%; Digital Mixers / Multitrack Recorders (DMX/MTR), 13%; Multi Effects (MFX), 12%; Handy Video Recorders (HVR), 10%; Professional Field Recorders (PFR) 7%; other 15%.

Products

Effect processors

Guitar effect processors 

 G1
 G1X
 G1Next
 G1XNext
 G1 Four
 G1X Four
 G1u
 G1on
 G1Xon
 G2
 G2.1u
 G2Nu
 G2.1Nu
 G3/G3X
 G5
 G7.1ut
 G9.2tt
 G11
 GFX-1
 GFX-3
 GFX-4
 GFX-5
 GFX-8
 GM-200
 MS-100BT
 MS-50G
 MS-70CDR
 ZFX
 503
 505
 505II
 508
 606
 606II
 707
 707II
 1010
 2020
 4040
 8080
 3000S
 3030
 4040
 9030
 9002
 9002 Artist's Edition
 9000s
 9050S
 9120
 9150

GFX-8

At the time it was released, the GFX-8 was the flagship of the Zoom GFX series.

It has a solid steel dark green body with an opto-based pedal on the right and red LED display on the top left. It uses the Variable Architecture Modeling System (V.A.M.S) technology. In general, there are three main internal modules: for drive, for modulation and for delay. The unit allows a high level of distortion customization by using specialized software. It also allows the use of external distortion. The technology used in the unit does not allow full reordering of the effects but allows some of modulation effects like wah and phaser to be connected before or after the drive module. The drive module implements dynamic related effects like compressor, overdrive, distortion and fuzz. After the drive module, the noise gate module called ZNR (ZOOM Noise Reduction) is connected, followed by a parametric equalizer (presence, treble, middle, bass). The amp simulation module is connected next and allows various types of guitar amplifier simulations. The modulation module implements effects like wah, phaser, chorus, ring modulator, tremolo, vibrato, flanger and pitch shifter. The delay module is used to implement delay and reverb effects. Effects that require high processing power use modulation and delay module together. One such effect is the jam play effect, which allows, for example, a guitar player to play a rhythm guitar part and then play a solo part over it. The unit design is oriented toward ease of use by providing more knobs than usually found on such units, thus making the unit look more like a chain of effect boxes instead of the typical effect processor with a "few knobs many functions" type design. The unit has mature MIDI capabilities, allowing both control from an external sequencer or using the unit as a MIDI controller. The MIDI OUT can be configured to act as MIDI THRU.

Bass guitar effect processors 
 708II
 607
 506
 506II
 B1
 B1x
 B1on
 B1Xon
 B2
 B2.1u
 B3
 B3n
 B9.1ut
 MS-60B

Acoustic guitar effect processors 
 504
 504II
 A2
 A2.1u
 A3

Studio rack mountable effect processors 
 RFX-2200
 RFX-2000
 RFX-1100
 RFX-1000
 Zoom Studio 1201
 Zoom Studio 1202
 Zoom Studio 1204
 9010
 9200

Digital recorders 

 H1 Handy Recorder
 H1n Handy Recorder
 H2 Handy Recorder
 H2n
H3-VR
 H4 Handy Recorder
 H5 Handy Recorder
 H4n Handy Recorder 
 H6 Handy Recorder
 F1-SP / F1-LP Field Recorder
 F2 / F2-BT Field Recorder 
 F3 Field Recorder
 F4 Field Recorder
 F8 Field Recorder
 F8n Field Recorder
 MRS-1608
 MRS-1266
 MRS-1044
 MRS-802
 MRS-8
 MRS-4
 PS-04
 PS-02
 HD8 / HD8CD
 HD16 / HD16CD
 R8
 R16
 R24
 Q2HD
 Q3
 Q3HD
 Q4
 Q4n
 Q8HD

Rhythm machines 
 RT-123
 RT-223
 RT-323
 RT-234
 MRT-3
 MRT-3b
 SB-246
 ST-224

 ARQ AR-48 
 ARQ AR-96

Guitar amplifiers 
 FIRE-36M
 FIRE-18M
 FIRE-36
 FIRE-18
 FIRE-7010

Audio interfaces 
TAC-2
TAC-2R
TAC-8
UAC-2
UAC-8

References

Further reading

External links 

NAMM.org: Oral History Library − "Masahiro Iijima Interview" (2014)

 
Music equipment manufacturers
Guitar effects manufacturing companies